Bonnykelly is a rural area to the west of the village of New Pitsligo in Aberdeenshire, Scotland.

References

Villages in Aberdeenshire